Horný Badín is a village and municipality in the Krupina District of the Banská Bystrica Region of Slovakia.

Genealogical resources

The records for genealogical research are available at the state archive "Statny Archiv in Banska Bystrica, Slovakia"

 Roman Catholic church records (births/marriages/deaths): 1800-1895 (parish B)
 Lutheran church records (births/marriages/deaths): 1786-1895 (parish B)

See also
 List of municipalities and towns in Slovakia

References

External links
 
Surnames of living people in Horny Badin

Villages and municipalities in Krupina District